The slaty brushfinch (Atlapetes schistaceus) is a species of bird in the family Passerellidae. It is found in humid Andean forests from western Venezuela, through Colombia, to Ecuador, with a disjunct population in central Peru. The latter is sometimes considered a separate species, the Taczanowski's brushfinch (A. taczanowskii). Furthermore, the Cuzco brushfinch from south-eastern Peru is sometimes considered a subspecies of the slaty brush finch.

References

slaty brush finch
Birds of the Colombian Andes
Birds of the Venezuelan Andes
Birds of the Ecuadorian Andes
slaty brush finch
Taxonomy articles created by Polbot